Schultesiophytum is a genus of plants first described as a genus in 1958. It contains only one known species, Schultesiophytum chorianthum , native to Colombia, Peru, and Ecuador in South America.

References

Cyclanthaceae
Monotypic Pandanales genera
Flora of South America